is a squadron of the French Air and Space Force. It houses the Dassault Rafale and was the second unit of the French Air and Space Force to receive the aircraft.

History

3rd Reconstitution and nuclear era 

On May 10, 1966, a Mirage IVA n°36 of the squadron conducted the first transatlantic flight with a combat aircraft at French reaction under the command of Commandant Dubroca and Captain Caubert in 7 hours and 40 minutes, in which three air supply aircraft reached Boston.

End of the Mirage IV 
On June 23, 2005, Mirage IV P n°59 conducted the last flight of Mirage IV of the squadron and the French Air Force, at the command of a commandant, operations chief of Gascogne. This equipment is displayed today on an aerial base.

The Escadron de chasse 1/91 Gascogne was credited with dropping 120 bombs and conducted 368 missions in Libya during Opération Harmattan.

Rafale 

The squadron was reformed on March 31, 2009, and equipped with Rafale, the unit integrated the Strategic Air Forces. From August 31, 2015, to September 18, 2015, 15 Rafale of the Escadron de chasse 1/7 Provence, Escadron de Chasse 2/30 Normandie-Niemen, and the 1/91 Gascogne were deployed to conduct an air-to-air campaign.

Unit awards

Operation Harmattan, then Unified Protector (2011)
 EC 1/91 Gascogne obtained a cross a citation at the orders of the Aerial Army.

Designations 
 Groupe de Bombardement II/19: April 1, 1937 - September 1, 1940, (GB II/19)
 Groupe de Bombardement Léger I/19: September 1, 1940 - February 21, 1944, (GBL I/19)
 Groupe de Bombardement Moyen I/19: February 21, 1944 - April 1946, (GBM I/19)
 Groupe de Bombardement I/19 Gascogne: January 1951 - November 1, 1955, (GB I/19 Gascogne)
 Groupe de Bombardement 1/91 Gascogne: September 1, 1956 - September 17, 1962, (GB 1/19 Gascogne)
 Escadron de Bombardement 1/91 Gascogne: June 1, 1964 - July 1, 1996, (EB 1/91 Gascogne)
 Escadron de Reconnaissance Stratégique 1/91 Gascogne: July 1, 1996  - June 23, 2005, (ERS 1/91 Gascogne)
 Escadron de Chasse 1/91 Gascogne: March 31, 2009 - September 1, 2016, (EC 1/91 Gascogne)
 Escadron de Chasse 1/4 Gascogne: since September 1, 2016 (EC 1/4 Gascogne)

Equipment 
 Martin B-26 Marauder (1944-1946)
 Douglas A-26 Invader (1951-1962)
 Dassault Mirage IVA then IVP (1964-2005)
 Dassault Rafale (since 2009)

See also
 List of French Air and Space Force aircraft squadrons
 History of the Armée de l'Air (1909–1942)
 Aviation in World War I

Notes

References

 Grolleau, Henri-Pierre. "Rafale F3: la polyvalence", Air Fan, no 367, juin 2009, p. 37 to 40 (ISSN 0223-0038)

External links

 Site officiel l'Escadron de Chasse 01.091 Gascogne (Official Website of Escadron de Chasse 01.091)
 site Armée de l'air de L'escadron de bombardement 01/091

Fighter squadrons of the French Air and Space Force
French Air Force personnel of World War II
French World War I pilots
Military units and formations established in 1937